Iraj Kaboli (12 April 1938 – 17 February 2021) was an Iranian writer, linguist and translator.

Biography
Iraj was born in 1938 in a Zoroastrian family in Kerman. He came to Tehran for his high school and pursued his education there at Alborz High School.

His passion for languages led him to learn several languages and he started to translate from English and Russian. He was also a friend and associate of Ahmad Shamloo, a member of the Iranian Writers' Association , and a member of the Council for Revising the Orthography of the Persian Language.

He was a member of the Board of Trustees of Hooshang Golshiri Foundation.

References
 
 http://www.pendar.net/main1.asp?a_id=4179
 http://www.kargozaaran.com/ShowNews.php?16456 

1938 births
2021 deaths
Linguists from Iran
Iranian translators
Persian-language writers
People from Kerman
Iranian Zoroastrians
People from Kerman Province
Iranian Writers Association members
Place of death missing